Hemistylus may refer to:
 Hemistylus (bryozoan), an extinct genus of bryozoans in the family Cellariidae
 Hemistylus (plant), a genus of plants in the family Urticaceae